Aberdeen F.C. competed in the Scottish Premier League, Scottish League Cup and Scottish Cup in season 1999–2000.

First-team squad
Squad at end of season

Left club during season

Results

Scottish Premier League

Final standings

Scottish League Cup

Scottish Cup

References

 AFC Heritage Trust

Notes

Aberdeen F.C. seasons
Aberdeen